Jessica "Jess" Tom (born March 24, 1984) is an American television personality and food writer who came to prominence as the joint winner of the fourteenth season of the Food Network television series Food Network Star (along with Christian Petroni).

Personal life 
Tom's mother is from Madagascar while her father is from China. She has cousins by the names of Jonathan and Grace. She has been married since 2016 and she publicly refers to her husband only as "D".

References

External links 
 

1984 births
American businesspeople
American food writers
American people of Malagasy descent
American writers of Chinese descent
American television chefs
Food Network chefs
Food Network Star winners
Living people
People from Queens, New York
American women chefs
21st-century American women